Ken Fletcher and Margaret Court were the defending champions, but lost in the semifinals to Fred Stolle and Ann Jones.

Stolle and Jones defeated Tony Roche and Judy Tegart in the final, 6–2, 6–3 to win the mixed doubles tennis title at the 1969 Wimbledon Championships.

Seeds

  Ken Fletcher /  Margaret Court (semifinals)
  John Newcombe /  Billie Jean King (quarterfinals)
  Tony Roche /  Judy Tegart (final)
  Fred Stolle /  Ann Jones (champions)

Draw

Finals

Top half

Section 1

Section 2

Section 3

Section 4

Bottom half

Section 5

Section 6

Section 7

Section 8

References

External links

1969 Wimbledon Championships – Doubles draws and results at the International Tennis Federation

X=Mixed Doubles
Wimbledon Championship by year – Mixed doubles